Nina Maria Stemme (born Nina Maria Thöldte on 11 May 1963) is a Swedish dramatic soprano opera singer.

Stemme "is regarded by today's opera fans as our era's greatest Wagnerian soprano". In 2010, Michael Kimmelman wrote of one of Stemme's performances in Richard Wagner's opera Die Walküre, "As for Brünnhilde, Nina Stemme sang gloriously. It's hard to recall anyone's sounding more commanding or at ease in the part, and that includes Kirsten Flagstad".

Early life and education
Born in Stockholm, the young Stemme played piano and viola. She attended Adolf Fredrik's Music School (Swedish: Adolf Fredriks Musikklasser), a high-profile song-and-chorus school in Stockholm. During a year as an exchange student at Langley High School in McLean, Virginia, she joined the school chorus, sang solos and won awards.

Parallel to her studies of business administration and economics at the University of Stockholm, Stemme followed a two-year course at the Stockholm Operastudio. Her debut as Cherubino in Cortona, Italy, in 1989 made Stemme decide to follow a professional singer's career; her studies at the University College of Opera in Stockholm were completed in 1994. In addition to two minor roles at the Royal Swedish Opera in Stockholm, she also sang Rosalinde (Die Fledermaus), Mimì (La bohème), Euridice in Gluck's Orfeo ed Euridice, and Diana (La fedeltà premiata by Haydn).

She sang in two singing competitions, Operalia, The World Opera Competition and Cardiff Singer of the World. As winner of Operalia in 1993, Stemme was invited by Plácido Domingo, founder of Operalia, to appear with him in a concert at La Bastille (1993); the same concert also took place on 1 January 1994 in Munich.

Career

Since her 1989 operatic debut as Cherubino in Cortona, Italy, Stemme has appeared with many opera companies, including the Royal Swedish Opera Stockholm, the Vienna State Opera, La Scala Milano, Semperoper Dresden, Grand Théâtre de Genève, the Zurich Opera, Teatro di San Carlo Naples, Gran Teatre del Liceu Barcelona, Opéra Bastille Paris, Bayerische Staatsoper Munich, Covent Garden London, Teatro Real Madrid, Teatro Colón Buenos Aires, the Metropolitan Opera New York, San Francisco Opera, as well as at the Bayreuth, Salzburg, Savonlinna, Glyndebourne and Bregenz festivals.

Her roles include Rosalinde, Mimì in La bohème, Cio-Cio San in Madama Butterfly, Turandot, Tosca, Manon Lescaut, Suor Angelica, Euridice, Katerina in Lady Macbeth of Mtsensk, the Countess in Le nozze di Figaro, Marguerite, Agathe, Marie, Nyssia (König Kandaules), Jenůfa, Marschallin, Eva, Elisabeth, Elsa, Senta, Sieglinde, Elisabeth in Tannhäuser and Isolde. This last brought her critical acclaim at Glyndebourne Festival Opera in 2003, on disc for EMI Classics with Plácido Domingo, Antonio Pappano and the chorus and orchestra of the Royal Opera, Covent Garden released in 2005 and most recently at the Bayreuth Festival in 2005 and again in 2006. In 2007 Stemme returned in the role of Isolde to Glyndebourne Festival Opera where she made her debut in the role.

In 2006, Stemme sang Maria in the premiere of Sven-David Sandström's Ordet – en passion, on March 24 in Stockholm. She also made her role debut in the title role of Aida in a new production at Zürich Opera and recorded her first album of Richard Strauss's Four Last Songs and final scenes. On the concert platform in 2006–07, she appeared in recital with Antonio Pappano (piano) in Barcelona and Dresden, in concert performances of Salome in Strasbourg and Paris and in recital at the Zürich Opera.

In 2008, Stemme replaced Deborah Voigt in what would have been Voigt's role debut as Brünnhilde in the opera Siegfried, part of a new Vienna State Opera Ring cycle conducted by Franz Welser-Möst. Stemme also sang Brünnhilde in the 2010 season opening at La Scala and in San Francisco Opera's 2011 Ring cycle.

In 2015 Stemme performed at GöteborgsOperan in Gothenburg, Sweden, in a new opera by composer Hans Gefors with libretto by Kerstin Perski and directed by Keith Warner. The opera is based on Alfred Hitchcock's spy thriller Notorious from 1946. Other members of the cast included Katarina Karnéus, John Lundgren and Michael Weinius.

In September and October 2016, Stemme returned to the role of Isolde in the Metropolitan Opera's new production of "Tristan und Isolde".

In 2017, Stemme was the soprano soloist at the Last Night of the Proms.

Stemme performs on average 40 times per year in various venues around the world.

Personal life
Stemme lives in Stockholm. She is married to stage designer Bengt Gomér and has three children. She speaks five languages.

Awards
1993: winner of Operalia, The World Opera Competition
2004: received Svenska Dagbladets Opera Award (Swedish: Svenska Dagbladets operapris)
2005: selected by a German expert 50-member jury through the Opernwelt magazine as the world's leading female opera singer
2006: appointed Member of the Royal Swedish Academy of Music
2006: appointed Hovsångerska by Carl XVI Gustaf of Sweden
2008: received the medal Litteris et Artibus by Carl XVI Gustaf of Sweden
2010: received the Laurence Olivier Award for Outstanding Achievement in Opera
2010: received the Italian award Premio Abbiati
2012: selected again by Opernwelt as "Female singer of the year"
2012: appointed Austrian Kammersängerin
2012: the Gramophone Award for best Opera Record was awarded to DECCA's recording of Beethoven's Fidelio with Stemme performing the role of Leonore with the Lucerne Festival Orchestra directed by Claudio Abbado
2013: selected as the world's leading female opera singer by International Opera Awards
2014: received the ninth annual Opera News Award "paying tribute to five superb artists who have made invaluable contributions to the art form: director Patrice Chéreau, tenor Juan Diego Flórez, mezzo-soprano Christa Ludwig, bass-baritone James Morris and soprano Nina Stemme"
2014: awarded Stockholms Stads Hederspris 2014 (City of Stockholm Honorary Prize 2014)
2016: awarded Honorary Doctor's Degree, Lund University, Sweden
 2016: received the Swedish Jussi Björling Award (Swedish: Jussi Björlingstipendiet)
2018: awarded the Birgit Nilsson Prize

Repertoire
Stemme's repertoire includes:

Discography
Stemme's recordings include:
Isolde in Richard Wagners Tristan und Isolde. (3 CD + 1 DVD). EMI 7243 5 58006 2 6
Strauss, Richard, Vier letzte Lieder. The final scene from Capriccio. The final scene from Salome. EMI Classics 0946 3 78797 2 6
Isolde in Wagner's Tristan und Isolde. Glyndebourne festival. Dir. Jiri Belohlavek. Opus Arte DVD OA 0988 D
Leonore in Beethoven's Fidelio. Dir. Claudio Abbado. Salzburger Festspiele. Decca 478 2551 (box), (478 2552, 478 2553)
The title role in Janáček's Jenůfa. Dir. Peter Schneider. Live from the Gran Teatre del Liceu, Barcelona, 2005. DVD. Naxos
Senta in Wagner's Der fliegende Holländer. Dir. David Parry. Chandos 3119 (2 CD). (Opera in English)
Mortelmans' concert aria Mignon (Kennst du das Land). Zsolt Hamar, conductor; Flemish Radio Orchestra. In Flanders' Fields, vol. 33. Phaedra 92033
The title role in Verdi's Aida. Züricher Opernhauses. Dir. Ádám Fischer. DVD. BelAir Classics
The First Plácido Domingo International Voice Competition – Gala Concert. Dir. Eugene Kohn. Sony classical 01-046691-10
The Marschallin in Strauss Der Rosenkavalier. Chor des Züricher Opernhauses. Nina Stemme, Malin Hartelius m.fl. Zürich. Dir. Franz Welser-Möst. EMI. DVD
Leonora in Verdi's La forza del destino. Chor und Orchestra der Wiener Staatsoper, dir. Zubin Mehta. Unitel classics (PROFIL 708108). DVD.
Victoria and She/soprano in Ingvar Lidholm, A Dream Play (Swedish: Ett drömspel) : opera with prelude and two acts. With Håkan Hagegård. Caprice CAP 22029:1–2. (2 CD)
Isolde in Wagner's Tristan und Isolde. Rundfunk-Sinfonieorchester Berlin, live 2012-03-27. Dir. Marek Janowski. PentatoneClassics PTC 5186404.
Elisabeth in Wagner's Tannhäuser. Dir. Marek Janowski. PentatoneClassics PTC 5186405
Minnie in Puccini's La fanciulla del West. DVD. Dir. Pier Giorgio Morandi. Royal Opera Stockholm. Euroarts Unitel Classica
Brünnhilde in Wagner's Die Walküre. Jonas Kaufmann, Anja Kampe, René Pape. Mariinsky Orchestra, dir. Valery Gergiev. MARO527
Sieglinde in Wagner's Die Walküre. Dir. Franz Welser-Möst. Wiener Staatsoper 2 December 2007. Orfeo C875 131B
Wagner's Wesendonck Lieder. Swedish Chamber Orchestra. Dir. Thomas Dausgaard. BIS 2022
Wagner's Wesendonck Lieder; Nystroem's Songs by the sea; De Boeck's Seven French songs. Jozef De Beenhouwer, piano. In Flanders' Fields, vol. 40. Phaedra 92040
Wagner's Wesendonck Lieder. Salzburg Festival, dir Mariss Jansons. DVD Euroarts.

References

Further reading
 Liese, Kirsten, Wagnerian Heroines. A Century Of Great Isoldes and Brünnhildes, English translation: Charles Scribner, Edition Karo, Berlin, 2013.

External links

Biography in Artistman site
Royal Opera House Stockholm website
New York Times review of Stemme in Tristan in Bayreuth (2006)
Nina Stemme Operabase

1963 births
Living people
Singers from Stockholm
Swedish operatic sopranos
Stockholm University alumni
Operalia, The World Opera Competition prize-winners
Österreichischer Kammersänger
Members of the Royal Swedish Academy of Music
Laurence Olivier Award winners
Litteris et Artibus recipients
20th-century Swedish women opera singers
21st-century Swedish women opera singers
Swedish people of Walloon descent